The Dumb Girl of Portici is a 1916 American silent historical drama film directed by Phillips Smalley and Lois Weber and starring Anna Pavlova, Rupert Julian and Wadsworth Harris.  It was adapted by Weber from the libretto by Germain Delavigne and Eugène Scribe for Daniel Auber's 1828 opera La muette de Portici (The Mute of Portici).  The film marked Pavlova's only feature film performance.

Overview 
The film was one of the most expensive film made at a cost at approximately $300,000. The film was the first major film directed by a woman director in the early 1910s.

Plot 
Fenella (Anna Pavlova) is a poor Italian girl who falls in love with Duke d'Arcos (Wadsworth Harris), a Spanish nobleman.

Cast
 Anna Pavlova as Fenella 
 Rupert Julian as Masaniello
 Wadsworth Harris as Duke d'Arcos
 Douglas Gerrard as Alphonso 
 Jack Holt as Conde 
 Betty Schade as Isabella 
 Edna Maison as Elvira 
 Jack Hoxie as Perrone 
 William Wolbert as Pietro 
 Laura Oakley as Rilla 
 Nigel De Brulier as Father Francisco 
 Lina Basquette as Child

Release 
The film was released on DVD/Blu-ray in 2018 with a new score by John Sweeney.

See also
The Mute of Portici (1922)
The Mute of Portici (1952)

References

Bibliography
 Slide, Anthony. Early Women Directors. A. S. Barnes, 1977.

External links

 The Dumb Girl of Portici at silentera.com

1916 films
American silent feature films
Films directed by Phillips Smalley
Films directed by Lois Weber
American black-and-white films
Universal Pictures films
1910s historical drama films
American historical drama films
Films set in the 1640s
Films set in Naples
Films based on operas
Films based on works by Eugène Scribe
1916 drama films
1910s English-language films
1910s American films
Silent American drama films